Harmonia hallii (formerly Madia hallii) is a species of flowering plant in the family Asteraceae known by the common names Hall's harmonia and Hall's madia.

Description
Harmonia hallii is an annual herb growing up to about 18 centimeters in maximum height, its stiff, leafy stem branching or not. It is coated in rough hairs, dark-colored stalked resin glands, and bristles. Most of the densely hairy leaves are clustered around the base of the plant.

The glandular inflorescence bears one or more flower heads with yellow ray florets up to half a centimeter long and sometimes tinged with red at the bases. The disc florets at the center are yellow. The fruit is a club-shaped achene about 3 millimeter long with a small pappus.

Distribution
Harmonia hallii is endemic to California, where it is known only from a small section of the North Coast Ranges. It has been reported only from Yolo, Lake, Colusa, and Napa Counties. It grows in chaparral on serpentine soils, and its habitat is limited and being lost to activities such as mining.

References

External links
Jepson Manual Treatment: Harmonia hallii
USDA Plants Profile: Harmonia hallii
Flora of North America: Harmonia hallii
Harmonia hallii Photo gallery

Madieae
Endemic flora of California
Yolo County, California
Plants described in 1935
Flora without expected TNC conservation status